Naramdiya Brahmins, also transliterated as Naramdev (देवनागरी : नार्मदीय ब्राह्मण), are descendants of the priests of the Somnath temple who were forced to migrate from Gujarat to Madhya Pradesh are settled along the bank of the Narmada River. Their migration owes to the forays and desecration of the Somnath temple by Mahmud Ghazni.

Narmadiya Brahmins Community

Naramdev brahmans regard themselves as Manasputra of river Narmada. Naramdevs are considered as Panchdravida Brahmin. They belong to around 40 gotras and are followers of Shukla Yajurveda, of Madhyandini, a sub-branch, under Vajsaneyi branch. Most of them are concentrated in five districts of Madhya Pradesh i.e. Harda, Khandwa, Barwani, Dhar and Khargone.

On the basis of regional affiliation naramdevs are divided as

Bhuvanaya based out of Harda, Hoshangabad
Nimadi based out of Khandwa, Khargone, Badwani
Malwi based out of Dhar

Naramdev brahmins generally refrain themselves to establish any nuptial ties with peoples of other regions i.e. bhuvanya with nimadi or malwis or its vice-versa, although they are not endogamous. Statistics reveals few peoples transcends his regional limit.

Many narmadiya brahmins are closely associated to the baba balipur for spirituality.

Mythology

Before the lineage of Shri Ram, in this tradition, the Universal Chakravarti Emperor, he once performed a huge yagya at Omkareshwar on the north bank of the holy Narmada. The blessings of the given brahmins were taken, then the brahmins started leaving then Mandhata went to him and requested that you people should reside here, I will give you the means of livelihood. Jyotirlinga on the banks of Narmada are pleased with such a place, they accepted the request and the Brahmins started doing selfless austerity by staying there, their desire to see mother Narmada. Even after doing hard penance, when the mother was not seen, I thought in my mind that we would give up our lives in this water and all jumped, Mother Narmada thought in her miThese brahmins are sacrificing their lives because of not getting my darshan, the mother took out those brahmins, all had fainted, as soon as the mother touched herself, all of them became alive. The brahmins saw that Makar Vahini was standing in front, everyone saluted mother. Reva said that you had attained death, I have given you life, that's why from today you are Narmadeya) Narmada ji, given by Narmada, became intuitive, since then it was called Narmadeya, later the word Narmadeya was added.

Notable Narmadiya Brahmins

 Late Shri Ramnarain Upadhyay- Literary Figure and Authority on Nimar Folks and culture.
 Aakash Patwari- Music Composer, Sound Engineer, Song Writer and Singer. 
 Prafull Billore - Entrepreneur also Known as MBA Chai Wala 
 Abhas Joshi- Participant and Anchor of "Voice of India" a popular TV show.
 Madhu Gargav- Ex- Mayor, Bhopal.
 P. C. Sharma Congress politician Bhopal
 Smt Akanksha Pare Kashiv Journalist, Poet and Short Story Writer. Recipient of awards like Outstanding journalist from MP & prestigious Ramakant katha Smriti Puruskar(National), Rajendra Yadav 'Hans Katha Samman', Her poetry included in Video magazine of Heidelberg University, Germany. National school of drama, delhi adapted her story 'Palash ke phool' in a play featured in 'SHRUTI', a monthly literary forum.
 Shubhangi Atre Poorey Indian Television actress.

References
http://naramdeo.com/

Brahmin communities of Madhya Pradesh